Parrotts Creek is a  long 3rd order tributary to the Rappahannock River in Middlesex County, Virginia, United States.

Variant names
According to the Geographic Names Information System, it has also been known historically as:  
Parrott's Creek

Course
Parrotts Creek rises on the Briery Swamp divide about 0.1 miles southeast of Jamaica, Virginia.  Parrotts Creek then flows easterly to meet the Rappahannock River at Ross Point, Virginia.

Watershed
Parrotts Creek drains  of area, receives about 45.6 in/year of precipitation, has a topographic wetness index of 446.54 and is about 62.7% forested.

Maps

See also
List of rivers of Virginia

References

Bodies of water of Middlesex County, Virginia
Rivers of Virginia
Tributaries of the Chesapeake Bay